Probably Love is a 2001 Italian drama film directed by Giuseppe Bertolucci.  It entered the "Cinema of the Present" section at the 58th Venice International Film Festival. Variety's film critic Deborah Young referred to it as "one of the most experimental fictional films to come out of Italy in many a moon". For his performance in this film Fabrizio Gifuni was appointed EFP Shooting Star at the 52nd Berlin International Film Festival.

Cast 

Sonia Bergamasco: Sofia
Fabrizio Gifuni: Cesare
Rosalinda Celentano: Chiara
Marcello Catalano: Gerard
Teco Celio: Pietro 
Carmen Scarpitta: Laura
Mariangela Melato: The acting teacher
Stefania Sandrelli: Herself 
Alida Valli: Herself

References

External links

Probably Love at Variety Distribution

2001 films
Italian drama films
Films directed by Giuseppe Bertolucci
2001 drama films
2000s Italian films